Colin Newell (July 1973 – 25 November 2020), known as Heavy D or The Boominator, was a British TV personality.

Life
He was best known for his roles in Storage Hunters and Celebrity Big Brother. Newell was a supporter of Arsenal Football Club and frequently took part in interviews for ArsenalFanTV. He took part in the 18th series of Celebrity Big Brother in August 2016.

Newell died on 25 November 2020 at the age of 47. He had a daughter born in 2019, with his ex-girlfriend, Bryony Harris.

References

External links

1973 births
2020 deaths
Big Brother (British TV series) contestants
Participants in British reality television series
Place of death missing
Place of birth missing